In algebra, plethysm is an operation on symmetric functions introduced by Dudley E. Littlewood, who denoted it by {λ} ⊗ {μ}.

If symmetric functions are identified with operations in lambda rings, then plethysm corresponds to composition of operations.

In representation theory
Let V be a vector space over the complex numbers, considered as a representation of the general linear group GL(V). Each Young diagram λ corresponds to a Schur functor Lλ(-) on the category of GL(V)-representations. Given two Young diagrams λ and μ, consider the decomposition of Lλ(Lμ(V)) into a direct sum of irreducible representations of the group. So for some nonnegative multiplicities  there is an isomorphism

The problem of (outer) plethysm is to find an expression for the multiplicities .

This formulation is closely related to the classical question. The character of the GL(V)-representation Lλ(V) is a symmetric function in dim(V) variables, known as the Schur polynomial sλ corresponding to the Young diagram λ. Schur polynomials form a basis in the space of symmetric functions. Hence to understand the plethysm of two symmetric functions it would be enough to know their expressions in that basis and an expression for a plethysm of two arbitrary Schur polynomials {sλ}⊗{sμ} . The second piece of data is precisely the character of Lλ(Lμ(V)).

References

Symmetric functions